The Cow Yard Brook is a small tributary of the Oakeys Brook, in central South Brunswick, New Jersey in the United States.

Course
The Cow Yard Brook starts at  near the intersection of Beekman Road, Northumberland Way, and US Route 1. It crosses Deans Lane near its intersection with Black Horse Lane.

Accessibility
The Cow Yard Brook is very short, but it can be accessed by some of the roads it crosses and the Oakeys Brook.

Gallery

See also
List of rivers of New Jersey

References

External links
USGS Coordinates on Google Maps

Rivers of Middlesex County, New Jersey
Tributaries of the Raritan River
Rivers of New Jersey